The 1945 All-American Girls Professional Baseball League season marked the third season of the circuit. The action began with six teams, like the previous season. But the Milwaukee Chicks and the Minneapolis Millerettes franchises were renamed the Grand Rapids Chicks and Fort Wayne Daisies respectively. The measure took effect for poor attendances in the cities of these teams the year before. At this point, the new clubs joined the Kenosha Comets, Racine Belles, Rockford Peaches and South Bend Blue Sox, all founding members of the league. The six teams competed through a 110-game schedule, while the split season was dropped in favor of a longer playoff format with the Shaugnessy format: the one seed facing the three seed and the two seed against the four seed. In addition, the pitching distance increased from 40 to 42 feet during the midseason.

Nevertheless, the pitchers continued to dominate the league as an all-time record eight no-hitters were recorded in the season. Rockford's Carolyn Morris hurled a perfect game against Fort Wayne, while South Bend's Betty Luna threw four shutouts in a stretch, including her first career no-hitter. Grand Rapids' Connie Wisniewski led all pitchers with her 32 victories and a 0.81 earned run average, rivalizing with Fort Wayne's Dorothy Wiltse who recorded 29 wins and a 0.83 ERA. But the other side, Mary Nesbitt of Racine was the only hitter to top the .300 mark (.319) while Fort Wayne teammates Helen Callaghan and Faye Dancer tied for the home run title with three a piece. Wisniewski was honored with the AAGPBL Player of the Year Award.

In the playoffs, champion Rockford played third place Grand Rapids and second place Fort Wayne took Racine. Rockford and Fort Wayne ended up facing each other in the finals, with Rockford becoming the first team to win both the season title and the championship in league history. Morris, who went 28–12 with a 1.08 ERA in the season, defeated the Chicks three times in the first round and repeated her feat against the Daisies in the finals, proving that good pitching is most important that hitting during a short series.

The AAGPBL drew 450,000  fans during the 1945 season, which represented a 19 percent raise over the previous year.

Final standings

Postseason

Batting statistics

Pitching statistics

All-Star Game

See also
1945 Major League Baseball season

Sources

External links
AAGPBL Official Website
AAGPBL Records
Baseball Historian files
The Diamond Angle profiles and interviews
SABR Projects – Jim Sargent articles
YouTube videos

All-American Girls Professional Baseball League seasons
1940s in women's baseball
1945 in baseball
All